Inhuman may refer to:

Comics 
Inhumans, a fictional race in Marvel Comics
Inhuman (comics), a comic book series focusing on Inhumans
Inhumans (TV series), a television series set in the Marvel Cinematic Universe
Kristoff Vernard, the Inhuman Torch, a Marvel Comics character

Music 
InHuman, a Belgian heavy metal band
Inhuman, a German DJ
Inhuman (album), a 2000 album by Desecration
Inhuman Condition, a 1992 EP from the band Massacre
Inhuman Grotesqueries, a 2007 LP from the band Malignancy
Inhuman Rampage, a 2006 album by the British band DragonForce
The Inhuman Condition, Sam Roberts' breakthrough album

Other uses 

 Inhuman Condition (TV series), a Canadian web series
 Inhuman Games, a game company

See also
Non-human, any entity displaying some, but not enough, human characteristics to be considered a human
Inhumanity (disambiguation)